Vivian Distin (née Liberto, formerly Cash) (April 23, 1934 – May 24, 2005) was an American homemaker and author. She was the first wife of singer Johnny Cash and the inspiration for his first hit single "I Walk the Line". Following her marriage, she became known for the controversy and misinformation surrounding her racial identity.

Biography

Vivian Cash was born on April 23, 1934, in San Antonio, Texas. Vivian, along with her brother Raymond Alvin Liberto and sister Sylvia Liberto were the children of Irene (Robinson), a homemaker, and Thomas Peter Liberto, an insurance salesman and amateur magician. Her father was of Sicilian descent from her paternal grandparents who immigrated to the United States from Cefalù, Palermo, Sicily. Her mother was of German, Irish, and African American descent.

On July 18, 1951, while in Air Force basic training, Johnny Cash met 17-year-old Vivian at a roller skating rink in San Antonio, Texas. The couple courted for three weeks before the Air Force deployed Cash to West Germany for a three-year tour. During the separation, the couple exchanged thousands of letters that would eventually form the basis for Liberto's memoir I Walked the Line, which was published in 2007. On August 7, 1954, one month after his discharge, they were married at St. Ann's Roman Catholic Church in San Antonio. The Wedding Mass was offered by Vivian's uncle, a Catholic priest named Father Vincent Liberto. They would go on to have four daughters: Rosanne, Kathy, Cindy, and Tara.

After marrying they settled in Memphis, Tennessee, where Johnny Cash took a job as a vacuum cleaner salesman. Within the first year of their marriage, Cash had become a rising country music star. After his rapid success, Cash moved Vivian and their family to Hollywood where he pursued film roles and entertainment industry connections when he wasn't on tour. In 1961, Cash moved the family to a hilltop home overlooking Casitas Springs, California. He had previously moved his parents to the area to run a small trailer park called the Johnny Cash Trailer Park. As Cash was frequently away from home on tour and the area had no amenities, Vivian and her daughters became increasingly isolated. Vivian often had to dispatch rattlesnakes and other vermin around the property. Liberto later said that she had filed for divorce in 1966 because of Cash's severe drug and alcohol abuse, as well as his constant touring and his repeated acts of adultery with other women, including his close relationship with singer June Carter. Their four daughters were then raised by Vivian.

Personal life

Johnny and Vivian Cash had four daughters: singer-songwriter Rosanne, Kathy, singer-songwriter/author  Cindy, and Tara. Her grandson Dustin Tittle is a film producer. After Johnny Cash had numerous affairs including a high-profile relationship with future wife June Carter Cash, Vivian filed for divorce in 1966 after twelve years of marriage. In 1968, Liberto married Dick Distin, a police officer in Ventura, California, to whom she remained married until her death on May 24, 2005, from complications of lung cancer surgery.

Religion
Vivian Liberto was raised in a strict and devoutly Catholic Sicilian American household. She attended the all girls Catholic school Saint Mary's Hall in San Antonio. She remained devoutly Catholic her entire life and was perennially active in her local church. Because of her remarrying after divorce from her first husband, Johnny Cash, Vivian was unable to receive Communion at Mass. However, Johnny Cash arranged to meet with the archdiocese on his ex-wife’s behalf; he signed a paper taking full blame for the divorce due to his adultery and use of drugs and alcohol, and Vivian's ability to receive communion was reinstated.

Memoir
In 2002 Vivian was approached by freelance writer/producer Ann Sharpsteen about appearing in a retrospective program about Johnny Cash for VH1. Though she declined the offer, the two became close friends and Vivian decided to publish her memoirs, hiring Sharpsteen as an editor and biographer. Published in 2007, Liberto entitled her memoir I Walked the Line: My Life With Johnny. The bulk of the book consists of excerpts from the thousands of letters that Johnny Cash and Vivian exchanged during their three-year separation along with Vivian's recollections of her courtship, marriage, Johnny Cash's rise to fame and feelings towards June Carter Cash.

Thunderbolt newsletter incident
In 1965 Vivian's husband Johnny Cash was arrested in Texas for possession of hundreds of amphetamine pills and bringing drugs into the United States across the Mexican border. Though both spouses had been estranged for the past three years, Vivian flew out to El Paso, Texas to accompany Cash to his court hearing. A widely circulated black and white photograph of them leaving the courthouse together was purposefully darkened and distorted by The Thunderbolt, a racist newsletter published by KKK leader J.B. Stoner and distributed by the White supremacist National States' Rights Party. The headline of the article read "Arrest Exposes Johnny Cash's Negro Wife." In response to the article in The Thunderbolt, Johnny Cash hired Nashville lawyer Johnny Jay Hooker and threatened a $25 million lawsuit against the KKK. However the incident soon faded and there was no impact on Cash's career at the time.

Nearly two years later, the KKK burned a cross on Johnny Cash's lawn (he was estranged from Vivian at the time who was living in Casitas Springs, California) due to vocal criticisms of the United States' treatment of Native Americans and his association with hippie counterculture figures including Bob Dylan. The KKK also reignited their racist hate campaign. Vivian and Johnny Cash received both hate mail and death threats. Flyers were distributed at Johnny Cash's concerts by Citizens United urging people to call a phone number where a reading of the Thunderbolt article played and declared, "the race mixers of this country continue to sell records to your teenage children." Saul Holiff, Johnny Cash's manager met with Robert Shelton Grand Wizard of the Ku Klux Klan and threatened a $200,000 lawsuit for harassment. Saul also contacted national and local newspapers to correct the story including a well received article in the New York Post. Vivian Cash's genealogy was professionally traced. They included Vivian's designation as White on her marriage certificate, a list of the Whites-only schools she had attended and letters from close associates. The legal validation of her race as Caucasian enabled Johnny Cash to be booked once again in the South.

Genealogy 

In 2021, genealogist Henry Louis Gates from the show Finding Your Roots, featured Rosanne Cash as his guest and confirmed Vivian Liberto's Sicilian ancestry. Her paternal ancestry traced back 300 years in Cefalù, Sicily. Vivian’s Grandfather Rosario Liberto arrived in New Orleans in 1895 and went on to found a chain of successful Italian grocery stores in San Antonio, Texas.

In addition, Gates discovered that one of Vivian's maternal great-grandfathers, Lafayette Robinson, was a mixed-race man whose mother was Sarah A. Shields, a mixed race woman born into slavery and freed (along with her eight siblings) by her white father and  owner William Shields. Gates also found wedding registry records for Sarah and her white husband, Andrew Robinson, who had married legally and openly during the Civil War in Perry County, Alabama, with Sarah's father paying the county recorder to register the wedding. Ten years later Sarah and her siblings were freed by their father through an act of legislature in Alabama in March of 1848. Their freedom was “confined as to residence to the counties of Perry, Dallas and Wilcox,” and precluded them the right to inherit land. Like Sarah, her siblings all married white people as did Sarah’s children, grandchildren and great grandchildren. 

According to her official biographer Ann Sharpsteen and Vivian Cash's own words in her 2007 memoir, Vivian strongly identified throughout her life as a White/Sicilian-American and did not identify as Black or multiracial. Cash stated in her memoir, "It didn't help that Johnny issued a statement to the KKK informing them that I wasn't black. To this day I hate when accusations and threats from people like that are dignified with any response at all."

Legacy
Black Cadillac, Rosanne Cash's eleventh studio album, is dedicated to Vivian Liberto, her father, and stepmother, June Carter Cash. The tracks “Burn Down This Town“ and “I Was Watching You” directly reference Vivian. Black Cadillac was nominated for a Grammy Award for Best Contemporary Folk album in 2007. Liberto was portrayed in the Cash biopic Walk the Line by actress Ginnifer Goodwin and by Anna Grace Stewart in the CMT miniseries Sun Records. Liberto's life and times are chronicled in the 2020 documentary film, My Darling Vivian, which premiered as part of the South by Southwest 2020 Film Festival Collection, presented by Amazon Prime Video.

References

External links 
 

1934 births
2005 deaths
Johnny Cash
Cash–Carter family
American people of African descent
American people of German descent
American people of Irish descent
American people of Italian descent
American Roman Catholics
People from San Antonio
People of Sicilian descent
African-American Catholics